Claude Peschier is a French former slalom canoeist who competed at the international level from 1967 to 1973.

He won four medals at the ICF Canoe Slalom World Championships with two golds (K1: 1969, K1 team: 1969) and two bronzes (K1 team: 1967, 1973).

His two sons Benoît and Nicolas have also competed in canoe slalom.

References

French male canoeists
Possibly living people
Year of birth missing (living people)
Medalists at the ICF Canoe Slalom World Championships